Shad Blair is an American former professional basketball player.

Career
After breaking his wrist in college, Blair gave up on pursuing professional basketball for sixteen years. In 2013, he was discovered by Ryan Wetzel, a former professional basketball player, in a local amateur league in Montana. With Wetzel's help, he attended the Las Vegas Overseas Basketball Combine in July 2014. In January 2015, at the age of 37, Blair signed with the Atlanta Wildcats of the American Basketball Association.

Documentary
Blair was the subject of the documentary Never too late.

References

External links
Never too late documentary

Living people
American men's basketball players
Basketball players from Montana
Power forwards (basketball)
Year of birth missing (living people)